Lee Taylor may refer to:

R. Lee Taylor (1924-2000), curator of the Museum of the Shenandoah Valley, U.S.
Lee Taylor (sailor), world water speed record holder 1967–1977
Lee Taylor (actor) in The Mechanism (TV series)

See also

Leigh H. Taylor, American attorney, professor and law school dean
Leigh-Taylor Smith (born 1986), Miss New York, 2008
Leigh Taylor-Young (born 1945), American actor